Dhamma Dewi of Pakhan (born Medaw Chit Pwa) was a principal queen of King Narapati II of Ava. She married the king in March 1502. She was the great grandmother of King Natshinnaung of Toungoo (r. 1609–10).

References

Bibliography
 

Queens consort of Ava
15th-century Burmese women
16th-century Burmese women